In Greek mythology, Satyrion or Satyria was a nymph perhaps from the region of Taranto, Italy. Her union with the god Poseidon produced Taras, eponymous founder of Taras.

Other use 

 Satyrions is a former name for orchids from their connection to satyrs. (see Orchis)
 Satyrion is also a name for ragwort and ancient aphrodisiac made from it. Though it may have been named after the nymph, it more likely derives from the mythical and lustful satyrs. This aphrodisiac is mentioned twice in the Satyricon of Petronius.
 Satyrion, the ancient name of Saturo at Italy near the Taranto.

Nymphs

Notes

References 

 Pausanias, Description of Greece with an English Translation by W.H.S. Jones, Litt.D., and H.A. Ormerod, M.A., in 4 Volumes. Cambridge, MA, Harvard University Press; London, William Heinemann Ltd. 1918. Online version at the Perseus Digital Library
 Pausanias, Graeciae Descriptio. 3 vols. Leipzig, Teubner. 1903.  Greek text available at the Perseus Digital Library.